Cotys III or Kotys III can refer to two kings of Thrace:

 Cotys III (Odrysian), ruled ca. 270 BC
 Cotys III (Sapaean), ruled 12–19 AD